The Feu follet or Fifollet is a legendary spirit in French and Louisiana folklore, similar to the Will-o'-the-wisp.

Feu follet, Feufollet or Feu-follet  may also refer to:

 Feufollet, an American band 
 The Fire Within (Le feu follet), a 1963 film
 The Wing-and-Wing (Le feu-follet), an 1842 novel 
 Transcendental Étude No. 5 (Liszt) (Feux follets)